Gilles Ateyaba Koffi Soler better known as Ateyaba, previously as Joke (born 27 October 1989) is a French rapper.

Early life
He was born in Narbonne, France and at 10 moved to Montpellier.

As an adolescent, he released some materials on Myspace through which he was discovered by Teki Latex (of TTC) and was included in Stunts, the rap division of the label Institubes.

Career
He recorded some materials in Paris that appeared in his mixtape Prêt pour l'argent in August 2009. He left Institubes after the release. He had independent releases, the EP Prêt pour l'argent 1.5 in with the guest appearance of the New York MC, Action Bronson. and EP Kyoto in 2012 and an appearance in Golden Eye Music 2012 compilation We Made It v.1 with the track "MTP Anthem", a tribute to his city Montpellier.

Joke released his third EP Tokyo on 27 May 2013. This project had a big success. The same year, he was signed to Def Jam France, part of Universal Music

His debut album Ateyaba was released on 2 June 2014 with a number of tracks from the album charting on the SNEP Singles Chart. On this project, Joke worked with major artists like Jhené Aiko and Pusha T.

In 2015, Joke released his fourth EP, Delorean Music.

Discography

Albums

EPs

Mixtapes

Singles

*Did not appear in the official Belgian Ultratop 50 charts, but rather in the bubbling under Ultratip charts.

References

External links
Official website

French rappers
1989 births
Living people
Musicians from Montpellier
French people of Togolese descent
French people of Spanish descent